The Fiat G.50 Freccia ("Arrow") was a World War II Italian fighter aircraft developed and manufactured by aviation company Fiat. Upon entering service, the type became Italy’s first single-seat, all-metal monoplane that had an enclosed cockpit and retractable undercarriage. On 26 February 1937, the G.50 conducted its maiden flight. During early 1938, the Freccias served in the Regia Aeronautica (the Italian Air Force) and with its expeditionary arm, the Aviazione Legionaria, in Spain, where they compared well in speed and manoeuvrability with their adversaries in the theatre.

The fighter was extensively used on various fronts by Italy, including in Northern Europe, North Africa, the Balkans, and the Italian mainland. The G.50 commonly came up against the British Hawker Hurricane, which was fast enough to frequently outrun the Italian opponent, and could also outrange it. In addition, early in the Second World War it became apparent that the G.50 possessed inadequate armament, comprising a pair of Breda-SAFAT  machine guns. Later models of the fighter incorporated improvements, including an increase in fuel capacity that gave rise to a substantial increase in range.

The G.50 was exported to several overseas customers, small numbers being flown by the Croatian Air Force while 35 G.50 fighters were shipped to Finland, where they served with distinction during both the Winter War of 1939–1940 and the Continuation War of 1941–1944 against the Soviet Union. In Finnish service, the type reportedly achieved an unprecedented kill/loss ratio of 33/1.

Development

Background
The Fiat G.50 had its origins in a design produced by Italian aeronautics engineer Giuseppe Gabrielli. This represented a major change for Fiat, who previously relied on chief engineer Celestino Rosatelli. External to Gabrielli's influence, the fighter's design was also shaped by the issuing of a specification during 1936 which sought a modern interceptor aircraft for the Regia Aeronautica (the Italian Air Force).

Gabrielli started work on the design in April 1935. The design was state-of-the-art for the era; on its introduction, it would become the most advanced fighter to be produced in Italy. Construction of two prototypes began mid-summer 1936. Manufacturing was turned over to CMASA (Costruzioni Meccaniche Aeronautiche S.A.), a subsidiary of Fiat at Marina di Pisa.

On 26 February 1937, the first prototype performed its maiden flight. Flown by Comandante Giovanni de Briganti, the chief test pilot for the G.50 program, it took off from Caselle airfield, Turin. During October 1937, it was officially unveiled to the public at the Milan International Aeronautical Show.

As a consequence of its new design, it was decided to conduct an extended flight evaluation program in order to validate its performance. During 1937, along with the first pre-series machines, a gruppo sperimentale (experimental group) was formed. Early flying experiences with the G.50 revealed it to possess relatively light controls and to be extremely maneuverable for a monoplane in comparison with prior designs. However, two separate issues were also identified, the limited power output of its radial engine and the lack of firepower, consisting of only a pair of machine guns.

Initial orders
During September 1937, Fiat received an order for an additional batch of 45 aircraft. In advance of the placement of a larger order, the Italian Air Ministry decided to hold a round of comparative 'fly-off' test flight between the type and the newly developed Macchi MC.200. On 8 November 1937, de Briganti was killed during the sixth evaluation flight of the second prototype (M.M.335), when the fighter failed to pull out of a high-speed dive. Flight tests conducted at Guidonia showed that the aircraft went too readily into an uncontrolled spin, a highly dangerous trait, especially at low level where recovery was impossible.

During a visit by the Italian King Victor Emmanuel III and Prime Minister Benito Mussolini, another tragedy occurred at Guidonia. While performing a low, fast pass, three G.50s flown by experienced pilots, Maggiore (Squadron Leader) Mario Bonzano and Lieutenants Beretta and Marasco, got into difficulty. Beretta's aircraft spun uncontrollably and crashed into the ammunition laboratory, killing the pilot. Despite the crashes, overall results from the flight test programme were deemed to be satisfactory and the Freccia proved to be more manoeuvrable than the faster Macchi MC.200, and the G.50 was declared the winner of the Caccia I ("Fighter One") competition on 9 June 1938. On account of its manoeuvrability, the Regia Aeronautica Commission decided to order the G.50 as well, rejecting the competition's third contender, the IMAM Ro.51.

The first production aircraft were delivered to the Regia Aeronautica in early 1939. Reportedly, Italian pilots did not like the enclosed canopy because it could not be opened quickly and, being constructed from plexiglas of relatively poor quality, was prone to cracking or abrasion by sand or dust, limiting visibility. In addition, exhaust fumes tended to accumulate in the cockpit, so pilots would often fly the fighter with the canopy locked open. Consequently, an open cockpit was installed in the second batch of 200 machines.

After 1939, the bulk of production for the G.50 was transferred to the CMASA factory in Marina di Pisa, Tuscany. Later versions of the aircraft could be distinguished by the addition of a larger rudder.

Further development
During 1938, the Regia Aeronautica requested that two-seat trainer variant of the G.50 be developed, designated G.50/B (Bicomando – dual control). The first of these were constructed during the second half of 1939. The student pilot sat in the front in a closed cockpit with two roll bars. The first five aircraft were part of the 1a serie ("first series"). Further production was entrusted to CMASA, who completed 106 G.50/Bs. A single G.50/B was later transformed into a reconnaissance aircraft, which was equipped with a planimetric camera. Another G.50/B was adapted with a tailhook for the purpose of operating as a naval reconnaissance aircraft from the aircraft carrier Aquila, but this vessel was never completed.

During September 1940, a slightly improved version, designated as the G.50 bis.

The ultimate version of the fighter was the G.50/V (Veloce – fast) built in mid-1941 by CMASA and equipped with a Daimler-Benz DB 601 engine of 1,075 CV. By this time, however, Gabrielli had already designed the Fiat G.55, and Fiat had obtained the licence to build the 1,475 CV Daimler Benz 605, so the G.50/V was used to test new equipment and then scrapped.

In total, production of the G.50 reached 784 aircraft; 426 of which having been manufactured by Fiat Aviazione and another 358 being built by CMASA. There were 58 fighters that were recorded as export sales: 13 G.50s had been sold to Spain, along with 35 aircraft to Finland and a final 10 to Croatia.

Two of the G.50 aircraft to be delivered were destroyed due to a lack of fuel before arriving in Finland. On 7 March, sergeant Asser Wallius forgot to switch the fuel pump to the main tank and the G.50 (FA-8) crashed, injuring the pilot. On 8 March, a Hungarian volunteer pilot, 2nd lieutenant Wilmos Belassy, apparently dived into the Baltic sea, after running out of fuel and failing to cross it from Sweden to Finland. The FA-7 and pilot have not been found. His fellow pilot, 2nd lieutenant Matias Pirity, had turned back and saved both the G.50 and himself.

Design
The Fiat G.50 was a low-wing single-engine monoplane fighter  interceptor aircraft. It featured all-metal construction, comprising a semi-monocoque fuselage with an exterior skin composed of light alloys. The structure of the fuselage was formed from four main longerons and 17 formers, closing into a load-bearing bulkhead forming the rear of the fuselage. The wings were divided into three separate sections, composed of a steel tube centre-section structure that was paired with duralumin outer wings and an alloy skin. The ailerons, which were both statically and aerodynamically balanced, had a metal structure covered by fabric. Hydraulically-actuated four-piece slotted-flaps were fitted to the aircraft's wings to improve its take-off and landing performance; these would automatically retract upon attaining a certain airspeed.

The G.50 was equipped with retractable landing gear, consisting of inwardly-retracting mainwheels and a fixed, castoring tailwheel. It was the first front-line Italian fighter to be fitted with a retractable undercarriage, an enclosed cockpit, and a constant speed propeller; these improvements have been credited with enabling the G.50 to achieve a maximum speed that was  faster than its contemporary, the Fiat CR.42 biplane. According to aviation author Gianni Cattaneo, the G.50 was a "robust and viceless aircraft which marked the introduction of new concepts and techniques, of design and manufacture".

Access for maintenance of the engine was provided via large cowling doors and panels on the fuselage aft of the firewall gave access for fuel tanks and armament. The engine incorporated a reduction gear which drove the Hamiliton-Fiat 3-bladed all-metal constant speed propeller.

The pilot sat in an enclosed cockpit under a sliding transparent canopy; the seat was adjustable both in height and angle of inclination to suit the pilot's preferences. Despite the canopy possessing favourable transparency, including a relatively unobstructed rearward view, pilots were unenthusiastic about the enclosed arrangement, leading to various types of open canopies being trialled and eventually a set of hinged transparent side-flaps were standardised upon.

A reflector sight was present for the purpose of aiming the fighter's armament, which comprised a pair of 12.7 mm (.5 in) Breda-SAFAT machine guns with 300 rounds of ammunition per gun. The machine guns, fitted directly forward of the cockpit, were fired using synchronisation gear to fire through the propeller arc; both single-shot and salvo-fire modes were available.

Operational history

Introduction

During 1938, the first operational Fiat G.50 fighters were delivered to the Regia Aeronautica. During the Spanish Civil War, about a dozen G.50s were dispatched to Spain to reinforce the Aviazione Legionaria, Italy's contribution to the conflict. The first of these were delivered to the theatre during January 1939. The value of its presence in the Spanish theatre is questionable as none of the fighters sent saw actual combat. At the civil war's end, the G.50s in the region were handed over to Spanish pilots and subsequently saw action in Morocco. Cattaneo summarised of the experience: "Little seems to have been learnt as nothing was done to increase the armament".

Upon the G.50's entry to service, it was widely regarded as being an extremely manoeuvrable aircraft and was often considered to be one of Italy's best fighters. However, by the time of the outbreak of the Second World War, rapid advancements in the field of aviation had contributed to the type being considered to be both underpowered and underarmed in comparison to competing frontline fighters then in use by the main powers. In spite of this, in the buildup to the Second World War, further units of the Regia Aeronautica were equipped with newly delivered G.50s; these were heavily used in various exercises and war-games from November 1939 onwards as it became increasingly clear that Italy would likely soon be at war with the Western democracies.

Upon Italy's entry into the Second World War in June 1940, the Regia Aeronautica possessed a total of 118 G.50s that were available for operations; of these, 97 aircraft were available to perform front line duties while others were either in maintenance or awaiting delivery. The majority of these were assigned to 51° Stormo, (group) which was based at Ciampino Airport (just outside Rome) and at Pontedera, with 22° Gruppo (wing) of 52° Stormo. On 10 June 1940, when Italy issued its declaration of war against both France and Great Britain, the G.50s of 22° Gruppo went into action, followed by the 48 aircraft of 20° Gruppo. Operations during the first few days were sporadic and varied, often serving as escorts for Savoia-Marchetti SM.79 bombers on attack missions against harbours and airfields on the island of Corsica. These operations were quickly brought to an end when France signed the Armistice of 22 June 1940, officially capitulating to the Axis powers.

Belgian deployment and the Battle of Britain
During September 1940, the 20° Gruppo (351/352/353 Squadrons), commanded by Maggiore Bonzano and equipped with Fiat G.50, was part of 56° Stormo, formed to operate during the Battle of Britain as part of the Corpo Aereo Italiano (Italian Air Corps, CAI) based in Belgium, together with the 18° Gruppo flying Fiat CR.42s. According to Cattaneo, the Italian government had decided to participate in the German air offensive against the British mainland due to political opportunism and in pursuit of prestige; he alleged that the Air Staff would have rather directed those aircraft towards other fronts where they would have stood a better chance of making a meaningful contribution.

In this theatre, the G.50 was normally hampered by its relatively slow speed, open cockpits and short range. Cattaneo also noted that the presence of poor weather conditions and the use of relatively unprepared personnel were additional factors that undermined the fighter's effectiveness. Those G.50s that were deployed were early models and thus furnished with an open canopy, which was useful in a typical Mediterranean climate but led to the pilots suffer heavily in the colder weather of northern Europe. The aircraft was also under-equipped, provided with a mediocre radio set (powered by batteries that were prone to freeze at altitude) and lacking any armour protection. 

The experiences of the early G.50s over Britain soon showed their inadequacies in combat. Their operations were considered to be next to useless during the campaign, in part because they were too short-ranged and stationed too far from enemy territory. The G.50 possessed relatively limited endurance, thus missions rarely exceeded one hour. The G.50 bis, which was equipped with larger fuel tanks, was already in production, but it was not sent to 20° Gruppo in time to participate. Its performance was also lacking: during one incident on 5 November 1940, a formation of 22 G.50s intercepted several British Hawker Hurricanes, resulting in the RAF fighters escaping with ease. On 21 November 1940, when a Bristol Blenheim attacked the airfield at Maldegem, Belgium, a pair of G.50s were scrambled, but they lost the bomber in the clouds. On 23 November, several G.50s followed a flight of four Hurricanes, but were unable to close on them. On 31 January 1941, another fruitless interception occurred when a number of G.50s were evaded by a single Blenheim that escaped into the clouds.

At the beginning of 1941, the CAI were redeployed back to Italy, leaving behind a pair of G.50 squadrons that stayed in Belgium alongside Luftflotte 2 until April 1941. Overall, the G.50s flew a total of 429 missions, 34 escorts and 26 scrambles for the CAI, but failed to engage any enemy aircraft during these actions. A single aeroplane was lost and seven more were damaged during the deployment. While operating with Luftflotte 2, 20° Gruppo lost four additional fighters and two pilots were killed. A pair of G.50s were recorded as having been damaged by friendly fire from German fighters and flak.

In Belgium, 20° Gruppo had the opportunity to see the German Messerschmitt Bf 109 in action; several G.50 pilots are known to have been trained to fly the type as well. Around the same time, a pair of Bf 109E pilots were attached to the Gruppo in mid-January 1941. On 8 April 1941, the last sighting of enemy aircraft by the G.50 occurred, during which the targets, identified as fighters, eluded them yet again.

The North African campaign
On 27 December 1940, the first 27 G.50s, belonging to 150ª and 152ª Squadriglia, 2° Gruppo Autonomo C.T., arrived in Libya, where they operated out of Brindisi and Grottaglie airfields. On 9 January 1941, these fighters performed their first combat mission in the theatre when Capitano Pilota (Flight Lieutenant) Tullio De Prato, commander of 150ª Squadriglia, was attacked by a Hawker Hurricane Mk I on the front line, forcing him to crash-land in the desert. On 31 January 1941, a new G.50-equipped unit, 155° Gruppo Autonomo C.T., consisting of 351ª, 360ª and 378ª Squadrons, commanded by Maggiore Luigi Bianchi, arrived in Libya. Caught up in the chaotic retreat of the Italian Army during the winter of 1940–41, however, the G.50s saw relatively little actual action.

One of the few initial claims of enemy aircraft being downed by Freccia pilots occurred on 9 April 1941, when Tenente Pilota Carlo Cugnasca (an expert pilot, and the first to deliver a G.50 to Finland), attacked a flight of three British Hurricane Mk Is from No. 73 Squadron and claimed to have downed one, although this loss was not confirmed. On his return, he was forced to crash-land his G.50, flipping the aircraft over on the airstrip but remaining unharmed.

At low level, the aerial clashes were often confused and had unpredictable effects. Tactical surprise was often a decisive factor in a given engagement, as shown on 14 April when a formation of 66 Axis aircraft, including eight G.50s from 351ª Squadriglia, attacked British forces stationed in the vicinity of Tobruk. The RAF defenders of No. 73 Squadron were outnumbered in this engagement, resulting in the Hurricanes, which were only marginally faster than the G.50, having to ignore the Axis fighters and concentrate their efforts upon attacking incoming bombers, which posed the greatest threat. Flying their G.50s, both Cugnasca and Marinelli attacked H.G. Webster's Hurricane while he was shooting at a Stuka dive bomber, resulting in Webster being finally shot down and killed over Tobruk. A Canadian pilot, ace Flight Lieutenant James Duncan ‘Smudger’ Smith (P2652), saw the engagement and subsequently shot down and killed both Cugnasca and Marinelli as well as damaging another G.50 before being shot down himself by the 351ª Squadriglia commander, Capitano Angelo Fanello.

On 27 May, 20° Gruppo was reinforced by 151ª Squadriglia, which was equipped with the new Fiat G.50 bis. This new version had almost two hours of flight endurance, due to the addition of an extra fuel tank in the internal fuselage section (which had been originally configured as a bomb bay). The aircraft still lacked radio sets and, despite their air filters, the desert sand could reduce the engine's lifespan to only 70–80 hours.

Although the G.50s were mainly outperformed by Desert Air Force fighters, their pilots sometimes managed to shoot down the faster and better-armed Hurricanes and P-40s. In the hands of expert pilots, the G.50 was even capable of scoring multiple kills during a single sortie. For instance, on the evening of 9 July 1941, Sergente Maggiore Aldo Buvoli of 378ª Squadriglia, 155° Gruppo Autonomo, took off from Castel Benito airfield to patrol Tripoli harbour and intercepted a flight of seven Blenheim light bombers, which had been engaged in a low-level attack on the ships. Two Fiat CR.42 biplanes from 151° Gruppo were already pursuing the Blenheims when Buvoli attacked, shooting at each bomber in sequence. One Blenheim ditched in the sea while another was shot down a few miles north of Tripoli. Two more failed to return to Luqa airfield in Malta and were posted as missing. For these successes, Buvoli was awarded the Silver Medal of Military Valor and subsequently credited with four kills. No. 110 Squadron reported the loss of a similar number of Blenheim IVs on its first mission since arriving in Malta from the British mainland during early July.

During the Battle of Sidi Barrani, the first major British offensive of the Western Desert Campaign, a number of G.50s operating out of Martuba Airbase, Derna District, attacked the British-held airfield at Sidi Barrani. On 18 November 1941, during Operation Crusader, the Desert Air Force was responsible for destroying 13 aircraft on the Ain el Gazala airfields, 10 of these being G.50s. On 19 November 20° Gruppo, based at Sid el Rezegh, suffered heavy losses when British armoured forces suddenly attacked the airfield. Of the 19 G.50s, only three escaped, with 80 pilots and ground crew taken prisoner. Altogether, 26 G.50s were lost and 20 Gruppo was left with only 36 G.50s, of which 27 were serviceable. Mario Bonzano, now a Tenente Colonnello and commander of 20° Gruppo, was among the captured, and his deputy, Furio Niclot Doglio, was almost shot down, since he was unaware of the British operation. Several G.50s were captured almost intact, and at least one was taken by No. 260 Squadron and later passed to No. 272 Squadron.

After 1941, the G.50 played only a minor role in the Regia Aeronautica. During June 1942, British intelligence estimated that 12 Gruppo had a total of 26 G.50s (10 of these being of a serviceable condition), while the backbone of 5a Squadra Aerea was estimated to have comprised a mixture of 104 C.202s, 63 C.200s, 32 Z.1007 and 31 S.79s.

Aegean theatre
After Italy declared war on Greece in October 1940, the Freccia commenced offensive operations against Greek and Allied forces over the Balkans and the Aegean Sea on 28 October, typically operating from airfields at Berat, Devoli and Grottaglie.

During the Greek campaign, adverse weather conditions was often responsible for hampering Axis air operations, however, a number of fiercely-fought aerial engagements were fought on several days, often accompanied by a large amount of overclaiming by personnel on both sides of the conflict. Early on 20 February 1941, a flight of Hawker Hurricane fighters were engaged in their first aerial combat over the Balkans when seven G.50s of 54 Gruppo were scrambled from Devoli to intercept a formation of RAF bombers with their Hurricane escorts. A few days earlier, a British cargo ship had delivered six Hurricanes and several Wellington bombers to Paramythia, Greece, boosting RAF power in the region. Freccias claimed to have downed both bomber and a fighter, while the British claimed responsibility for downing four G.50s. That afternoon, 15 G.50s engaged a large mixed formation of RAF Gloster Gladiators, claiming the downing of 10 aircraft for the loss of one G.50. The RAF claimed three G.50s with no loss. Postwar records showed one Bristol Blenheim and a single G.50 being lost on that day.
 
On 28 February 1941, RAF units intercepted a formation of Italian bombers and their escorts, claiming 27 aircraft shot down and several others damaged in the ensuing battle. The Italians claimed to have downed six Gladiators and a single Supermarine Spitfire. The recorded losses were one Gladiator and eight Italian aircraft; many more were damaged. After this battle, the Regia Aeronautica was no longer an effective force within the theatre.

On 4 March 1941, a single G.50 bis was responsible for the shooting down of Hurricane V7288, piloted by Australian RAF ace Flight Lieutenant Nigel Cullen (who was credited with 15 or 16 victories) off Valona coast (Albania), while he was flying as wing-man for ace Pat Pattle. During the course of the Greek campaign, a flight of 10 G.50 fighters were recorded as having been lost, including both combat losses and others that had been destroyed by a combination of accidents and as a consequence of Allied bombing missions against Italian airfields.

Sicilian and Italian campaigns
During the second half of the war, the G.50 was typically operated as a multi-role fighter and ground attack aircraft, equipped only with external bombs. During the opening phase of the Allied invasion of Sicily, the G.50 was the most numerous aircraft used by the Regia Aeronautica to counterattack the Allied landings.

Just prior to the start of the invasion, a specialised ground attack unit of the Regia Aeronautica, 50° Stormo Assalto, was repositioned to Southern Italy; this unit was equipped with G.50 bis fighter-bombers. As soon the invasion started, on 10 July 1943, additional units were rushed to the area to participate in the Axis counter-attack. Alongside various other Italian and German ground attack units, 45 G.50 bis of 158 and 159 Gruppi Assalto from Pistoia were committed to attack Allied naval assets, landing craft and troops. Ten of these saw action on 11 July in conjunction with several Re.2002s and escorted by five Re.2005s of 362a Squadron, when they were intercepted by an overwhelming fighter "umbrella". In the ensuing engagement, three G.50s were shot down, including Tenente Colonnello (Wing Commander) Guido Nobili, commander of 5 Stormo Assalto. The remainder of the Italian air forces returned to their base where, after landing, the fighters were mostly destroyed on the ground by a follow-up air attack.

By the time of the Italian Armistice with the Allies, only a handful of G.50 fighters were left in service in Italy. A number of these continued to be operated as part of the Italian Co-Belligerent Air Force, while at least four G.50s were used by the Aeronautica Nazionale Repubblicana as fighter trainers. The top-scoring Italian pilot to use the G.50 was Furio Lauri, who was credited with 11 "kills" prior to the end of 1941, eventually achieving a final score of 18 enemy aircraft downed.

In Finnish service

The G.50 saw its longest and most successful service in the two Finnish wars against the Soviet Union, the Winter War of 1939–1940 and the Continuation War of 1941–1944. At the end of 1939, before the outbreak of hostilities, Finland ordered 35 Fiat G.50s. The first 10 aircraft were to be delivered before February 1940. A group of Finnish pilots attended a 10-hour training course at Guidonia airport and later at Fiat Aviazione in Turin. The windscreen was damaged.

Germany hindered the transit of the aircraft,  so they were dismantled and embarked in La Spezia on the Norwegian ship Braga, which set sail for Turku, Finland, on 20 January. Because of this delay, the first G.50s did not reach No. 26 Squadron, Finnish Air Force (HLeLv 26) at Utti until February 1940.
The G.50s were numbered from FA-1 to FA-35, but it seems that only 33 were delivered.
Squadron No 26 received from material command G.50 fighters according to the table below. A day before the truce after the Winter War, they had received 30 Fiat G.50s of the 35 purchased and 33 not damaged during the procurement.

Fiat G.50 FA-8 was destroyed during take-off when the pilot, a Hungarian volunteer, second lieutenant Wilhelm Bekasy, in bad flying weather, lost contact with his countryman, lieutenant Matias Pirity, who turned back. The next day sergeant Asser Wallenius took-off with FA-7, having forgotten to switch on the fuel pump of the main tank and as the extra fuel tanks emptied, FA-7 crashed and was damaged. Wallenius survived but he was injured. Because of technical problems in the Finnish airforce itself, only 33 of the 35 Fiat G.50s were delivered to Finland.

The Italian fighters had arrived too late to affect the course of that year's winter battles, however, most of them were soon sent to the front. The Fiat pilots found themselves involved in the heavy fighting over the bay of Vyborg in late February and early March. According to some sources, the first kill was achieved on 26 February. The following day, Second Lieutenant Malmivuo became the first Finnish pilot to be killed in a G.50, when his fighter FA-12 crashed after a battle with Soviet aircraft. And on 11 March, the Italian volunteer Sergente Diego Manzocchi crashed to his death while returning from a combat sortie. The Fiat bases were under constant attack. The Utti airfield was bombed by the Soviet airforce. Consequently, the Fiats were transferred two kilometres to the northwest of Utti proper, onto the ice at Haukkajärvi (Falcon lake). As Haukkajärvi became bombed and attacked by fighters, another lake-side base was established near the city of Lahti, Hollola, also on the ice of Vesijärvi near Pyhäniemi manor.

Overall, HLeLv 26 achieved 11 kills, against one loss in combat and one pilot killed in an accident (the aircraft was repaired and returned to service in 1941).

The Finnish G.50 y were taken from the 235 built by CMASA, both Serie I and Serie II, but all but seven had the open cockpit of the Serie II, a feature that Finnish pilots disliked, especially in winter. There were some attempts to improve the aircraft – one was tested with an enclosed cockpit, another with a D.XXI ski-undercarriage – but none of the modifications were put into service. Better protection for the propeller, which had problems at extremely low temperatures, and a few other changes were introduced.
At this stage, Finnish pilots preferred the Hawker Hurricane, the French Morane-Saulnier M.S.406 and the Brewster F2A Buffalo to the G.50.

Air victories from late February to early March 1940

Source: Fiat.laivue – Lentolaivue 26 sodassa (The Fiat Squadron – the Squadron n:o 26 in war), pages 152 and 153. appendix Koneluettelo (Aircraft list), Kari Stenman, Maininkitie 14 A, FI-02320 ESPOO, +358 9 8092187, http://www.kolumbus.fi/kari.stenman, printed Otavan Kirjapaino Oy, Helsinki, 2013, 

The first demonstration of the Finnish Air Force's effectiveness came on 25 June 1941, when the G.50s from HLeLv 26 shot down 13 out of 15 Soviet SB bombers. Thirteen aerial victories were achieved altogether.

During the Continuation War, the G.50s were most successful during the Finnish offensive of 1941, after which they became ever less impressive. In 1941, HLeLv 26 claimed 52 victories for the loss of only two fighters. The Soviets brought better, newer types of fighter to the front line in 1942 and 1943, while the Fiats were becoming old and run-down and the lack of spare parts meant that pilots were restricted to a minimal number of sorties. Nevertheless, between 30 November 1939 and 4 September 1944, the G.50s of HLeLv 26 shot down 99 enemy aircraft, including aircraft more modern than they, such as the British fighters sent to the USSR. In the same period, Finnish squadrons lost 41 aircraft of several types. But Fiat lost in combat were just three, with a ratio victory/loss of 33/1.

The most successful Finnish G.50 pilots were Oiva Tuominen (23 victories), Olli Puhakka (11 or 13), according to other sources, Nils Trontti (6), Onni Paronen (4), Unto Nieminen (4) and Lasse Lautamäki (4). The Finnish G.50s were finally phased out of front-line duty in the summer of 1944. They were no more than 10 or 12, and even as trainers, they did not last long, since they lacked spare parts. Unlike the slightly older MS.406, there was no effort to change their engine to make them better and faster. The last G.50 was struck off the inventory on 13 December 1946, at the FAF flight academy in Kauhava.

In Croatian service

In October 1941, the Croatian Air Force Legion requested military aid from Italy, that country agreed to deliver 10 Fiat G.50s (nine single-seaters and one two-seater), along with ancillary equipment. On 12 June 1942, the Fiat G.50 bis fighters took off from Fiat Aviazione in Turin for Croatia, but before they reached the border, they were stopped on the orders of Ugo Cavallero, Chief of the Italian Supreme Command, who feared that the Croatian pilots would defect. The G.50s had to wait until 25 June before being delivered to the Croatian Air Force, which assigned them to the 16th Jato at Banja Luka and were intensively used until 1945 against Yugoslav Partisans, at first in Bosnia and Herzegovina, then in Serbia, Croatia and Dalmatia. During 1942, a Croatian G.50 bis squadron was transferred from Northern Yugoslavia to the Ukrainian front, flanking the 4th Luftflotte.

On 25 June 1943, the Zrakoplovstvo Nezavisne Drzave Hrvatske (Air Force of the Independent State of Croatia, or ZNDH), received nine G.50 bis fighters and one G.50B. In October, while based at Zalužani airfield, Banja Luka, they flew many strafing missions against partisans for nearly a year.

After the Italian armistice of 8 September 1943, the Luftwaffe supplied the Croatian Air Force Legion with 20–25 Fiat G.50s captured on Regia Aeronautica airfields in the Balkans. These equipped two Croatian fighter units, but by the end of 1943 only 10 aircraft remained. Three G.50s captured after the Armistice were loaned to Kro JGr 1 at the beginning of 1944. In 1944 some of the G.50s were operated at the Brezice training school. ZNDH entered 1945 with seven G.50s (two operational). On 10 March 1945 six of these Fiats were based in Lucko, operated by 2.LJ (Lovacka Grupa, Fighter Group). Three were damaged by RAF Mustangs of Nos 213 and 249 Squadrons attacking Lucko airfield with napalm bombs, on 25 March, and the following day one of the last operative Freccia  was flown to a RAF-held airfield by vod (Corporal) Ivan Misulin that defected, together with vod Korhut (flying a Bf 109 G-10). The last G.50s were captured by Yugoslav Partisans. After the war, the G.50s were used for some time by the newly formed Yugoslav Air Force – the last G.50s on active service.

Variants

G.50
First production version.
G.50 bis
Development of the G.50 version with extended range; 421 built.
G.50 bis/A
Two seat carrier fighter modified from a G.50B; one modified.
G.50 ter
More powerful version with a 746 kW (1,000 hp) Fiat A.76 engine; one built.
G.50V
Liquid-cooled V12 variant with a Daimler-Benz DB 601 engine; one built.
G.50 bis A/N
Two-seat fighter-bomber prototype; one built.
G.50B
Two-seat trainer version. 100 aircraft built.
G.51
Projected production version of the G.50V, abandoned in favour of the Fiat G.55.
G.52
Projected version of the G.50, powered by a Fiat A.75 R.C.53 engine. The engine never materialised and the G.52 was never built.

Operators

 Air Force of the Independent State of Croatia received 15+ aircraft.

 Finnish Air Force received 33 aircraft (FA-1 to FA-6 and FA-9 to FA-35)of the 35 ordered. FA-7 and FA-8 were destroyed in accidents before they arrived in Finland; they crossed the Gulf of Bothnia in the spring of 1940.
 No. 26 Squadron, Finnish Air Force

 Luftwaffe

 Regia Aeronautica
 Gruppo Sperimentale da Caccia Spanish Civil War from January 1939 to March 1939, the aircraft was transferred to the Spanish Airforce, 12 F.50 fighters
 351st squadron (351ª Squadriglia)
 352nd squadron (352ª Squadriglia)
 353rd squadron (353ª Squadriglia)
 354th squadron (354ª Squadriglia)
 355th squadron (355ª Squadriglia)
 357th squadron (357ª Squadriglia)
 358th squadron (358ª Squadriglia)
 359th squadron (359ª Squadriglia)
 360th squadron (360ª Squadriglia)
 361st squadron (361ª Squadriglia)
 Aviazione Legionaria 12 aircraft
 Italian Co-Belligerent Air Force

 Aeronautica Nazionale Repubblicana

 Ejército del Aire

 SFR Yugoslav Air Force one ex-Croatian

Survivors

In September 2010, the only known G.50 bis still in existence was undergoing restoration in the Museum of Aviation, in Surčin, at Nikola Tesla Airport, Serbia.

Specifications (G.50)

See also

References

Sources
 Arena, Nino. I caccia a motore radiale Fiat G.50 (in Italian). Modena: Mucchi editore, 1996. NO ISBN
 Avions Militaires 1919–1939 – Profils et Histoire (in French). Paris: Hachette, Connaissance de l'histoire, 1979.
 Cattaneo, Gianni. "The Fiat G.50." Aircraft in Profile Number 188. Leatherhead, Surrey, UK: Profile Publications Ltd., 1967.
 Colace, Alessandro. "Fiat G.50 Saetta" . Lulu Publications, 2013. 
 Dunning, Chris. Solo Coraggio! La storia completa della Regia Aeronautica dal 1940 al 1943 (in Italian). Parma, Italy: Delta Editrice, 2000. NO ISBN.
 Ethell, Jeffrey L. Aircraft of World War II. Glasgow: HarperCollins/Jane's, 1995. .
 Gunston, Bill. Fighting Aircraft of World War II. London: Salamander Book Limited, 1988. .
 Gunston, Bill. Gli Aerei della Seconda Guerra Mondiale (in Italian). Alberto Peruzzo Editore, .
 Keskinen, Kalevi, Kari Stenman and Klaus Niska. Fiat G.50, Suomen Ilmavoimien Historia 8 (in Finnish). Espoo, Finland: Tietoteos, 1977. .
 Malizia, Nicola. Fiat G-50 (Aviolibri Records No. 2) (in Italian/English). Roma-Nomentano, Italy: Istituto Bibliografico Napoleone, 2005. .
 Malizia, Nicola. Ali sulla steppa. La Regia Aeronautica nella campagna di Russia (in Italian). Rome: IBN Editore, 2008. .
 Massimello, Giovanni. Furio Nicolot Doglio Un pilota eccezionale (in Italian). Milano: Giorgio Apostolo editore, 1998.
 Massimello, Giovanni and Giorgio Apostolo. Italian Aces of World War Two. Oxford/New York, Osprey Publishing, 2000. .
 Mattioli, Marco. "Il G.50 nella Guerra d'Inverno" (in Italian). Aerei nella Storia magazine, Parma, January 2000
 Mondey, David. The Concise Guide to Axis Aircraft of World War II. New York: Bounty Books, 1996. .
 Neulen, Hans Werner. In the Skies of Europe: Air Forces Allied to the Luftwaffe 1939–1945. Ramsbury, Marlborough, UK: The Crowood Press, 1998. .
 Rocca, Gianni. I disperati (in Italian). Milan: Arnoldo Mondadori Editore, 1991.
 Santoni, Alberto. "L'Ultra vola in alto" (in Italian). Storia Militare, Albertelli editions, Parma, July 2007.
 Savic, D. and B. Ciglic. Croatian Aces of World War II (Osprey Aircraft of the Aces 49). Oxford, UK: Oxford, 2002. .
 Sgarlato, Nico. G.50/55 (in Italian). Parma, Italy: Delta editions 2004.
 "A Second String Arrow" Part 1. Air International, May 1988, Vol. 34, No 5, pp. 251–258. Bromley, UK: Fine Scroll. ISSN 0306-5634.
 "A Second String Arrow" Part Two. Air International, June 1988, Vol. 34, No 6, pp. 295–298, 308–311. Bromley, UK:Fine Scroll. ISSN 0306-5634.
 Shores, Christopher. Ground Attack Aircraft of World War II. London: Macdonald and Jane’s, 1977. .
 Shores, Christopher, Air Aces, Greenwich, CT, Bison Books, 1983. .
 Shores, Christopher, Giovanni Massimello and Russell Guest. A History of the Mediterranean Air War 1940–1945: Volume One: North Africa June 1940 – January 1942. London: Grub Street, 2012.978-1-908117-07-8. ISBN
 Spick, Mike. The Complete Fighter Ace: All the World's Fighter Aces, 1914–2000. London: Greenhill Books, 1999. .
 Taylor, John W. R. "Fiat G.50 Freccia (Arrow)". Combat Aircraft of the World from 1909 to the Present. New York: G.P. Putnam's Sons, 1969. .
 
 Tonizzo, Pietro. Fiat G.50 Freccia (Le Macchine e la Storia 9) (in Italian). Modena, Italy: Editore Stem-Mucchi. No ISBN.
 Waldis, Paolo. Fiat G 50, Ali e Colori 3 (in Italian/English). Torino, Italy: La Bancarella Aeronautica, 2000.

External links

 Fiat G.50 Freccia
 The Fiat G.50 Freccia
 World War II aircraft page 

1930s Italian fighter aircraft
World War II Italian fighter aircraft
G.050
Single-engined tractor aircraft
Low-wing aircraft
Aircraft first flown in 1937
World War II aircraft of Finland